Bourron-Marlotte–Grez is a railway station between Bourron-Marlotte and Grez-sur-Loing, Île-de-France, France.

The station

The station opened in 1860 and is on the Moret–Lyon railway. The station is served by Transilien line R (Paris-Gare de Lyon) operated by SNCF.

Gallery

See also
Transilien Paris–Lyon

References

External links

 

Railway stations in Seine-et-Marne
Railway stations in France opened in 1860